FC Irpin Horenychi was an amateur club from Horenychi and participated in the regional competitions of Kyiv Oblast. The club became famous for fielding former Ukraine international footballers who were about to retire from professional sport.

The club was founded in 2005, although Horenychi used to have a football team before that won several champion titles of Kyiv Oblast back in 1960s-1970s.

The club dissolved in 2009.

Honours
Ukrainian Amateur Cup
 Winners: 2008

Former players
Andriy Kovtun, Mykola Volosyanko, Vladyslav Vashchuk, Anatoliy Bezsmertnyi, Yuriy Dmytrulin, Andriy Annenkov, Eduard Tsykhmeistruk, Serhiy Nahornyak, Vitaliy Kosovsky, Serhiy Konovalov, Serhii Rebrov, Taras Lutsenko, Artem Yashkin, Vasyl Kardash, Valyantsin Byalkevich, Yuriy Hrytsyna, Viktor Ulyanytsky, others.

External links
 Valerko, A. The last club of Rebrov. Football.ua. 19 November 2010.

 
Defunct football clubs in Ukraine
Football clubs in Kyiv Oblast
Association football clubs established in 2005
Association football clubs disestablished in 2009
2005 establishments in Ukraine
2009 disestablishments in Ukraine